Mardanshah was a 7th-century Sasanian prince. He was the son of the Sasanian king (shah) Khosrow II and Shirin, and was the preferred successor of the Sasanian Empire. He was later killed along with his brothers and half-brothers by his half-brother Kavad II in 628.

References

Sources

7th-century Iranian people
628 deaths
Year of birth unknown
Sasanian princes
People executed by the Sasanian Empire
Heirs apparent who never acceded
Children of Khosrow II
Executed royalty